Claude Gray (born January 26, 1932) is an American country music singer-songwriter and guitar picker best known for his 1960 hit "Family Bible," which has been covered by many different artists. Gray's other hit, "I'll Just Have Another Cup Of Coffee," was covered and rearranged by Jamaican reggae singer-songwriter Bob Marley, who retitled the song as "One Cup Of Coffee."

Alongside artists such as Ray Price, Jim Reeves, Eddy Arnold, Don Gibson and Chet Atkins, Gray was a purveyor of the Nashville sound, embracing the Countrypolitan movement which paved the way for pop-oriented singers in country music and attracted new audiences to the genre.

Early life
Gray was born in Henderson, Texas, United States, where he started his singing career while attending high school. After school, he served in the United States Navy from 1950 to 1954. Upon his return to home, he worked as a salesman for the rest of the decade. He began a recording career in 1959, after working as a radio announcer in Kilgore, Texas, and performing as a disc jockey in Meridian, Mississippi.

Career
Gray was approached by D Records in 1959, and recorded "I'm Not Supposed," which was released as his first single. The song made the Cashbox country charts. The following year, Gray and two friends purchased the song "Family Bible" from Willie Nelson for $100. Gray then recorded the song, and released it as a single." It peaked at No. 10 on the country chart. In 1961, "I'll Just Have a Cup of Coffee (Then I'll Go)," was released, which peaked at No. 4, and was followed by the biggest hit of Gray's career, the No. 3 "My Ears Should Burn (When Fools Are Talked About)," which was penned by Roger Miller. Gray's final top ten hit came in 1967 with "I Never Had the One I Wanted," which was also his final charted song upon re-release in 1979.

In the late 1970s, Gray co-wrote with Walt Breeland, a controversial song titled "The Ballad of Jimmy Hoffa." Gray's record label at the time (Mercury Records) refused to allow him to record the song, but he eventually recorded it for Ol' Podner Records, who subsequently released it directly to the Teamsters. In 1986, he released a cover of Neil Diamond's "Sweet Caroline."

Today, Gray continues to tour with The Claude Gray Roadshow, performing shows throughout North America and in parts of Europe, where classic country music remains popular. Recently, Gray has appeared in Branson and is also a performer on the RFD-TV cable television Network.

Personal life
Gray stands 6'5" and because of his height, was given the moniker, "The Tall Texan."

Discography

Albums

Singles

References

American country singer-songwriters
Singer-songwriters from Texas
1932 births
Living people
People from Henderson, Texas
Gold Star Records artists
Mercury Records artists
Country musicians from Texas